Scaphura is a genus of bush crickets in the sub-family Phaneropterinae. Some of the species within Scaphura are Batesian mimics of wasps, for example the type species, Scaphura nigra, is a polymorphic Batesian mimic of wasps of the genus Pepsis and Entypus (Pompilidae) and the potter wasps Polistes (Vespidae). The genus is restricted to South America.

Species

The following species are included on Scaphura:
Scaphura argentina (Hebard, 1931)
Scaphura conspurcata Brunner von Wattenwyl, 1878
Scaphura denuda Guérin-Méneville & Percheron, 1836
Scaphura edwardsii Westwood, 1828
Scaphura elegans (Serville, 1838)
Scaphura fasciata Brunner von Wattenwyl, 1878
Scaphura infuscata  Brunner von Wattenwyl, 1878
Scaphura lefebvrei  (Brullé, 1835)
Scaphura marginata  (Walker, 1869)
Scaphura nigra  (Thunberg, 1824)
Scaphura obscurata  (Stoll, 1813)

References

Tettigoniidae genera
Taxa named by William Kirby (entomologist)
Phaneropterinae